Graeme Bonham-Carter (born in 1939) is a UK-born Canadian mathematical geologist. He served as president of the International Association for Mathematical Geosciences (IAMG) from 2000 to 2004. He was Editor-in-Chief of the journal Computers & Geosciences from 1996 to 2005. He received the William Christian Krumbein Medal in 1998 from the IAMG.

Education

BA in Natural Sciences and Geology, Cambridge University in 1962
MA in Geology, University of Toronto in 1963
PhD in Geology, University of Toronto in 1966
Post Doc Stanford University 1966-1969

Book(s)
John W. Harbaugh, Graeme Bonham-Carter, Computer Simulation in Geology, Wiley-Interscience, 1970, 575 p. Republished by Krieger, 1981.
Graeme F. Bonham-Carter, Geographic Information Systems for Geoscientists: Modelling with GIS (Computer Methods in the Geosciences), Pergamon Press, 1994, now Elsevier, p. 398, 2014
Graeme Bonham-Carter, Qiuming Cheng (Eds), Progress in Geomathematics, Springer Publishers, 2008, p. 554.

References

Living people
Alumni of the University of Cambridge
University of Toronto alumni
1939 births